Alhambra High School is a high school that forms part of the Phoenix Union High School District in Phoenix, Arizona.  The campus is located at 3839 West Camelback Road, northwest of downtown Phoenix, Arizona, United States.

The school predominantly serves students from partner elementary districts Alhambra,  Isaac and Phoenix Elementary, although students from across the district come to Alhambra for its Phoenix Union Magnet Program—Medical and Health Studies.

History 
Alhambra High was founded in 1961, and was, along with East and Maryvale, one of three schools opened by the Phoenix Union High School District in the 1960s.

The campus was designed by the noted local architecture firm of Weaver & Drover. The construction contract to build the school was awarded to Gilbert & Dolan Construction Co.

Student population 
The school, like all other schools within the PUHSD, is a minority-majority school. 77.6% of the students enrolled are identified as "Hispanics". African Americans form 7.2% of the student population.

Sports 
Alhambra's Boys Basketball team won two state titles, in 1974 and 1985, under coach Phil Kemp. The team defeated East High in 1974, and Catalina High School in 1985.

The school's Boys Cross Country team has been placed first in a number of occasions: 2010, 2009, and 2007.

Notable alumni
Esthefanny Barreras - pro soccer player
Billy Boat - auto racer; 2nd place, Indy 500
Bob Breunig - pro football player
Paul Cook - science fiction writer
Eric Johnson - pro football player
Michelle Johnson - actress
Jason P. Lester - ESPY Award winner, EP1C ultra endurance athlete, and author
Steve Malovic (1956–2007), American-Israeli basketball player
Alex Dontre (formerly Preiss) - Drummer in the group Psychostick
Ted Sarandos - Chief Content Officer for Netflix
Richard Wingo -  Hollywood Talent Manager Notable celebrities include Johnny Holmes

References

External links
 
 Phoenix Union High School District website

High schools in Phoenix, Arizona
Educational institutions established in 1961
Public high schools in Arizona
1961 establishments in Arizona